NA-179 Muzaffargarh-V is a constituency for the National Assembly of Pakistan.

Election 2002 

General elections were held on 10 Oct 2002. Syed Basit Ahmad Sultan Bokhari of PML-Q won by 63,778 votes.

Election 2008 

General elections were held on 18 Feb 2008. Muhammad Moazzam Ali Khan Jatoi of PPP won by 79,643 votes.

Election 2013 

General elections were held on 11 May 2013. Makhdoomzada Basit Bokhari of PML-N won by 110,197 votes and became the  member of National Assembly.

Election 2018 

General elections are scheduled to be held on 25 July 2018.

See also
NA-178 Muzaffargarh-II
NA-180 Muzaffargarh-IV

References

External links 
Election result's official website

NA-179

Constituencies of Muzaffargarh
Politics of Muzaffargarh
Constituencies of Pakistan